Al-Khairat Sport Club, is an Iraqi football team based in Karbala, that plays in the Iraq Division Two.

Managerial history
 Makki Al-Ghurabi
 Alaa Mohammed Salih

See also
 2021–22 Iraq Division Two

References

External links
 Al-Khairat SC on Goalzz.com
 Iraq Clubs- Foundation Dates

2005 establishments in Iraq
Association football clubs established in 2005
Football clubs in Karbala